was a  after Gen'ō and before Shōchū. This period spanned the years from February 1321 to December 1324.

Change of era
 1321 : The new era name was created to mark an event or series of events. The previous era ended and the new one commenced in Gen'ō 3. The era name is derived from the I Ching; it should not be confused with the later Genkō (1331–34), which used a different character for kō (弘, "wide", instead of 亨, "go smoothly.")

Events of the Genkō era
 1321 (Genkō 1, 2nd month): The udaijin Fujiwara-no Saionji Kinakira died.
 1321 (Genkō 1, 4th month): The former-Emperor Go-Uda ordered the construction of a small chapel at Daikaku-ji where he lived in retirement.
 1321 (Genkō 1, 5th month): The emperor visited Dikaku-ji to see this new chapel for himself.
 1321 (Genkō 1, 6th month): , the shogunate strongman in Kyūshū (called the ), died.
 1321 (Genkō 1, 12th month): Hōjō Norisada, the daimyō of Suruga Province and a close relative of the shogunate's shikken, Hōjō Takitoki, was named governor of Kyoto at Rokuhara; and Hōjō Hidetoki was named military governor of Kyūshū.
 1322 (Genkō 2, 1st month): The emperor visited the former-Emperor Go-Uda at Daikau-ji; and he was entertained by a musical concert.
 1322 (Genkō 2, 1st month): Saionji Sanekane died at age 74.
 1323 (Genkō 3, 3rd month): Ichijō Uchitsune lost his position as kampaku, and Kujō Fusazane was made his successor.
 July 16, 1324 (Genkō 4, 25th day of the 6th month): Former Emperor Go-Uda's death.

The oldest extant account of Buddhism in Japan, the Genkō Shakusho (元亨釈書), was completed in  Genkō 2, whence the era name in its title. The massive project was the work of Kokan Shiren.

Notes

References
 Nussbaum, Louis-Frédéric and Käthe Roth. (2005).  Japan encyclopedia. Cambridge: Harvard University Press. ;  OCLC 58053128
 Titsingh, Isaac. (1834). Nihon Ōdai Ichiran; ou,  Annales des empereurs du Japon.  Paris: Royal Asiatic Society, Oriental Translation Fund of Great Britain and Ireland. OCLC 5850691
 Varley, H. Paul. (1980). A Chronicle of Gods and Sovereigns: Jinnō Shōtōki of Kitabatake Chikafusa. New York: Columbia University Press. ;  OCLC 6042764

External links
 National Diet Library, "The Japanese Calendar" -- historical overview plus illustrative images from library's collection
 Kyoto National Museum  -- "Treasures of Daikaku-ji", including portrait of Go-Uda and the former-emperor's will
 

Japanese eras
1320s in Japan